Achasta (also, Achiesta) is a former Ohlone settlement in Monterey County, California. It was located at the site of modern-day Monterey.

References

Costanoan populated places
Monterey, California
Former Native American populated places in California
Former settlements in Monterey County, California